Heinrich LXXII, Prince Reuss of Lobenstein and Ebersdorf (27 March 1797 – 17 February 1853) was the ruling prince of Reuss-Lobenstein from 7 May 1824 until his abdication on 1 October 1848, and of Reuss-Ebersdorf from 1822 to 1848. He was a cousin of king Leopold I of Belgium.

Unlike with most European monarchies, his large regnal number does not indicate that he was preceded by seventy-one previous rulers also named Heinrich. By tradition, all male members of the House of Reuss are named Heinrich, and are numbered by order of birth within the family in general. In the Reuss Younger Line, the numbering system was reset at the beginning of each century; thus Heinrich LXXII's high number is directly related to his having been born at the very end of the eighteenth century.

Heinrich LXXII abdicated in 1848, due to civil unrest in connection with the revolutions that spread through Germany and elsewhere in Europe that year. Because he was the last of his branch of the family, on his death his principality passed to the Prince Reuss zu Schleiz, unifying the lands of the Reuss Younger Line.

Ancestry

Notes

References

External links
 The Fürst on a coin

1797 births
1853 deaths
People from Saalburg-Ebersdorf
Princes of Reuss